Living Years is the second album by Mike + The Mechanics, released in 1988. The album reached number 13 on the US Billboard 200 and number 2 on the UK Albums Chart.

History 
Mike Rutherford began writing songs for the album in September 1987, shortly after the conclusion of Genesis's Invisible Touch Tour. However, he found himself immediately stricken with writer's block, a circumstance he attributes to stress over the complications with his wife's pregnancy, which endangered their child's life. The baby (Rutherford's third) was safely delivered in November, and Rutherford said that the relief made him feel "like a new man". In January he entered an extremely prolific songwriting period, and by the end of the month he had what he and producer/co-writer Christopher Neil felt was a good album's worth of material. In light of this, Neil wanted to move up the recording sessions, which had been scheduled for April. Rutherford vetoed the idea, however, and with his burst of inspiration still running, most of the songs that eventually appeared on the album were written over the next two months.

The first single taken off the album, "Nobody's Perfect," peaked at number 63 on the Billboard Hot 100.

The next single off the album, "The Living Years", was a worldwide number one hit, reaching that mark on the Billboard Hot 100 chart the week ending 25 March 1989. The song also reached number one on the Australian ARIA singles chart the week ending 13 May 1989. In the United Kingdom, it spent three weeks at number 2 in January and February 1989, behind Marc Almond and Gene Pitney's reworking of "Something's Gotten Hold of My Heart."

The title song was co-written by Rutherford and B. A. Robertson, both of whose fathers had recently died. However, the lyrics were written solely by Robertson, and dealt with Robertson's strained relationship with his father and the birth of his son three months after his father's death. Paul Carrack, who would sing lead on the recording, had himself lost his father when he was only eleven years old, and he continues to feature the song regularly in his solo performances.

A third single off the album, "Seeing is Believing", reached number 62 on the Billboard Hot 100.

Phil Collins and Tony Banks, Rutherford's Genesis bandmates, made a guest appearance playing the riff on "Black & Blue" (a sample by Banks of Collins and Rutherford playing a riff during the Invisible Touch sessions).

The Living Years Deluxe Edition was released on 20 January 2014, featuring extensive liner notes by journalist Mario Giammetti, a new recording of the hit song with Andrew Roachford on vocals and a bonus CD of live and rare tracks.

Reception

AllMusic's retrospective review summarised 'Slickly produced with rich vocals from Paul Carrack and Paul Young, The Living Years moves smoothly between anthemic ballads such as the title track and more up-beat numbers such as "Seeing Is Believing."' They commented that the album was inconsistent, however, at times venturing into genres that the group could not handle convincingly.

Track listing

Personnel 

Mike + The Mechanics
 Mike Rutherford – guitars, bass
 Paul Carrack – vocals (lead: 2, 4, 7, 10)
 Paul Young – vocals (lead: 1, 3, 5, 6, 8, 9)
 Adrian Lee – keyboards
 Peter Van Hooke – drums

Additional personnel
 Sal Gallina – keyboards
 B.A. Robertson – keyboards
 Alan Murphy – guitars
 Martin Ditcham – percussion
 Luís Jardim – percussion
 Christopher Neil – backing vocals
 Alan Carvell – backing vocals
 King's House School Choir – choir on "The Living Years"
 Michael Stuckey – choir master

Production 
 Christopher Neil – producer 
 Mike Rutherford – producer 
 Nick Davis – engineer
 Paul Gomersall – assistant engineer
 Terry Irwin – assistant engineer
 Halpin Grey Vermeir – cover design
 Geoff Halpin – photography
 John Swannell – photography

Charts

References

Mike + The Mechanics albums
1988 albums
Albums produced by Mike Rutherford
Albums produced by Christopher Neil
Atlantic Records albums
Warner Music Group albums
Virgin Records albums